The Office of Inspector General (OIG) for the United States Department of Health and Human Services (HHS) is responsible for oversight of the United States Department of Health and Human Service's approximately $2.4 trillion portfolio of programs. Approximately 1,650 auditors, investigators, and evaluators, supplemented by staff with expertise in law, technology, cybersecurity, data analytics, statistics, medicine, economics, health policy, and management and administration. Based on Federal Employee Viewpoint Survey scores, OIG has been ranked the best place to work (number 1) in HHS for 5 consecutive years by the Partnership for Public Service.

Mission
Since its 1976 establishment, the mission of the OIG as mandated by the Inspector General Act (Public Law 95-452, as amended), is to protect the integrity of HHS’s programs as well as the well-being of the beneficiaries of those programs.

As appropriate, OIG works with HHS staff and operating divisions, the Department of Justice (DOJ), other executive branch agencies, Congress, States, and private sector representatives to achieve systemic improvements, improved compliance, successful enforcement actions, and recovery of misspent funds. OIG work is conducted in accordance with the Council of the Inspectors General on Integrity and Efficiency (CIGIE) Quality Standards for Inspection and Evaluation, the U.S. Government Accountability Office (GAO) Government Auditing Standards, and the CIGIE Quality Standards for Investigations.

OIG work includes: advanced data analytics and modeling; criminal, civil, and administrative investigations; compliance guidance and education; technical expertise on program integrity issues; cyber security oversight.

OIG holds accountable those who bill HHS programs but do not meet Federal health program requirements or who violate Federal laws regarding the use of Federal health care funds. OIG also identifies opportunities to improve the economy, efficiency, and effectiveness of HHS programs.

OIG reports both to the Secretary of HHS and to the United States Congress about program and management problems and recommendations to correct them. OIG's work is carried out by regional offices nationwide that perform audits, investigations, inspections and other mission-related functions.

OIG Organization

The OIG consists of the following components:

Office of Audit Services (OAS).  OAS conducts audits that assess HHS programs and operations and examine the performance of HHS programs and grantees.  In FY 2020, OIG produced 178 audits. OIG uses data analytics and risk assessments to identify emerging issues and target high-risk areas to ensure the best use of audit resources.

Office of Evaluation and Inspections (OEI).  OEI conducts national evaluations to provide HHS, Congress, and the public with timely and reliable information on significant issues. In FY 2020, OIG produced 44 evaluations.

Office of Investigations (OI).  OI conducts criminal, civil, and administrative investigations of fraud and misconduct related to HHS programs, operations, and beneficiaries.  With investigators working in almost every State, OI coordinates with DOJ and other Federal, State, and local law enforcement authorities.  OI also coordinates with OAS and OEI when audits and evaluations uncover potential fraud.

Office of Counsel to the Inspector General (OCIG).  OCIG is an in-house, full-service law office, providing legal advice to OIG and compliance guidance to the healthcare industry.  OCIG also provides enforcement and compliance measures, working with DOJ on False Claims Act cases and independently on OIG administrative civil monetary penalty and exclusion actions.

Mission Support and Infrastructure (MSI).  MSI is composed of the Immediate Office of the Inspector General and the Office of Management and Policy.  MSI is responsible for coordinating OIG activities and providing mission support, including setting vision and direction for OIG’s priorities and strategic planning; ensuring effective management of budget, finance, human resource management, and other operations; and serving as a liaison with HHS, Congress, and other stakeholders.

List of Inspectors General

References

External links
 

United States Department of Health and Human Services agencies
Organizations with year of establishment missing
Auditing in the United States
Health and Human Services